Iswar Prasanna Hazarika is an Indian politician and civil servant. He was elected to the Lok Sabha, the lower house of the Parliament of India from the Tezpur constituency as a member of the Indian National Congress.

Dilip Kumar Neog's book titled "A Voice for Assam in Parliament" presents a collection of speeches and questions raised by Hazarika during his tenure as an MP.

Life 
Iswar Prasanna Hazarika was born in 1937 to lawyer Tirtheswar Hazarika from North Lakhimpur and Mokshada Devi, both active in the Indian independence movement. Hazarika studied at Banaras Hindu University and the Delhi School of Economics, and went on to become a civil servant, serving at key positions related to public sector undertakings, including as the Director of the Board of NTPC and the chairman and managing director of MMTC.

In 1996, Hazarika was elected as a member of the Lok Sabha from the Tezpur Lok Sabha constituency, Assam.

References

External links
 Official biographical sketch in Parliament of India website

India MPs 1996–1997
Lok Sabha members from Assam
1937 births
Indian National Congress politicians from Assam
Living people